Luiz Henrique Augustin Schlocobier (born 3 May 1999), known as Luiz Henrique or sometimes as Luizinho, is a Brazilian professional footballer who plays as a midfielder for Operário Ferroviário, on loan from Santos.

Club career

Coritiba
Born in Mafra, Santa Catarina, Luiz Henrique joined Coritiba's youth setup in 2008, aged nine. Promoted to the first team for the 2019 campaign, he made his senior debut on 23 January of that year, coming on as a late substitute for Kady in a 1–1 Campeonato Paranaense home draw against Maringá.

Luiz Henrique contributed with 18 appearances with the main squad in the campaign, as his side achieved promotion to the Série A. He made his debut in the category on 12 August 2020, replacing Matheus Galdezani in a 0–1 away loss against Bahia.

Luiz Henrique scored his first senior goal on 20 January 2021, netting the opener in a 3–3 home draw against Fluminense.

Santos
On 23 July 2021, Luiz Henrique moved to Santos. He made his club debut on 28 August, replacing Carlos Sánchez in a 0–4 home loss against Flamengo.

On 11 April 2022, Luiz Henrique was loaned to Série B side Novorizontino for one year. On 14 December, after featuring rarely, he moved to Operário Ferroviário also in a temporary deal.

Career statistics

References

External links

1999 births
Living people
Sportspeople from Santa Catarina (state)
Brazilian footballers
Association football midfielders
Campeonato Brasileiro Série A players
Campeonato Brasileiro Série B players
Coritiba Foot Ball Club players
Santos FC players
Grêmio Novorizontino players
Operário Ferroviário Esporte Clube players